Roger Amedee Del'Haye DFC was a Canadian flying ace pilot in the First World War who shot down 9 German Aircraft.

Del'Haye was born in France at Châlons-sur-Marne on 9 January 1889, educated at the University of Paris and emigrated to Regina, Canada, becoming a British subject in 1914.

Combat record
Del'Haye joined the RFC in October 1915 and served with No.13 Squadron from April 1916 to May 1917 on Royal Aircraft Factory B.E.2's and RE8's.  After converting to single-seater aircraft, from May 1918 he served with No. 19 Squadron RAF, shooting down one Fokker Dr.I and eight Pfalz Scout airplanes.  He ended the War as a Flight Commander, having also received the British DFC and the Belgian Croix de Guerre.

In the 1930s, alongside his civilian job, Del'Haye commanded RCAF Reserve Squadron No. 120. By 1944, he had become an Air Commodore but was killed on 18 November of that year flying a Harvard Trainer which crashed on take-off.

Honours and awards
 3 December 1918 - Distinguished Flying Cross - Capt. Roger Amedee Delhaye in recognition of gallantry in flying operations against the enemy in France. "A most efficient fighting leader to whose example the high standard of efficiency attained by his squadron is large due. He has led numerous offensive patrols, accounting for eight enemy machines. On all occasions he has shown hugh courage, ability and fine leadership."

References

Dolphin and Snipe Aces of World War 1 - Norman Franks (Osprey Aircraft of the Aces 48)

1889 births
1944 deaths
People from Châlons-en-Champagne
Royal Canadian Air Force officers
Canadian World War I flying aces
Recipients of the Distinguished Flying Cross (United Kingdom)
University of Paris alumni
Royal Flying Corps officers
Royal Air Force officers
Royal Air Force personnel of World War I
British Army personnel of World War I
Recipients of the Croix de guerre (Belgium)
French emigrants to Canada
Royal Canadian Air Force personnel of World War II